Killarney Vale is a suburb of the Central Coast region of New South Wales, Australia, located approximately 5 kilometres south of The Entrance. It is part of the  local government area.

The Entrance – Long Jetty hospital is located in Killarney Vale. It is a Community Health Centre of NSW Department of Health. It does not have an Accident or Emergency service. The hospital is located in buildings that were originally built as the club house for Tuggerah Lakes Golf Club.

Killarney Vale contains two public primary schools. Wyong Road is the main road that runs through Killarney Vale linking The Entrance to Wyong. A second main road running along the south western edge is Eastern Road.

Along Wyong Road, there are Killarney Vale shops which includes a small Coles supermarket. Originally a branch of the Newcastle value orientated Shoey's Food Barn chain, the supermarket was converted to a Bi-Lo and then most recently converted into a Coles supermarket. Previously sub-branches from The Entrance of Commonwealth Bank (where the cycle shop is currently located) and Westpac were located in the shopping area. Both banks have closed and been replaced by cash machines. As a local shopping area there is a pharmacy, medical, bakery, and other specialist retail.

It was named after the town of Killarney in Ireland.

Population
According to the 2016 census of Population, there were 7,216 people in Killarney Vale.
 Aboriginal and Torres Strait Islander people made up 4.7% of the population. 
 82.9% of people were born in Australia. The next most common countries of birth were England 2.9% and New Zealand 1.5%.   
 90.2% of people spoke only English at home. 
 The most common responses for religion were Catholic 26.7%, No Religion 26.4% and Anglican 25.2%.

References

Suburbs of the Central Coast (New South Wales)